Christian Conrad Blouin (1 November 1941 – 12 January 2019) was a Papua New Guinean Roman Catholic bishop.

Early life 
Blouin was born in Canada and was ordained to the priesthood in 1969. He served as bishop of the Roman Catholic Diocese of Lae, Papua New Guinea, from 2007 to 2018.

See also

Notes

1941 births
2019 deaths
20th-century Canadian Roman Catholic priests
21st-century Roman Catholic bishops in Papua New Guinea
Roman Catholic bishops of Lae